Mian Chenar-e Mazkur (also Romanized as Mīān Chenār-e Maẕkūr; also known as Meyān Chenār and Mīān Chenār) is a village in Chenar Rural District, Kabgian District, Dana County, Kohgiluyeh and Boyer-Ahmad Province, Iran. At the 2006 census, its population was 31, in 7 families.

References 

Populated places in Dana County